Ministry of Science, Technology and Innovation may refer to:

Ministry of Science, Technology and Innovation (Brazil)
Ministry of Science, Technology and Innovation of Denmark
Ministry of Science, Technology and Innovation (Malaysia)
Ministry of Science, Technology and Innovation (Uganda)